During the 2012–13 season, the Sheffield Steeldogs participated in the semi-professional English Premier Ice Hockey League.

Schedule and results

Preseason

Regular season

See also 
 Sheffield Steeldogs
 English Premier Ice Hockey League

External links 
 Sheffield Steeldogs Official Website

Sheff
Sheffield Steeldogs seasons